Leonardo Patterson (born c. 1942) is a controversial antiquities dealer who specialises in Pre-Columbian artefacts. He was born to Jamaican parents and was raised in Cahuita, Costa Rica. Patterson started work as an apprentice jeweller, moving on to work as an antiquities middle-man as he gained exposure to a wider range of objects, and graduating to the role of international dealer and collector.

Patterson began to deal on a large scale in New York in the 1960s and 1970s when restrictions on the trade in antiquities were loose. In the 1970s, restrictions were tightened on the export of archaeological artefacts as more countries took an interest in what was happening to their cultural heritage and in 1983 the United States signed a UNESCO convention on the illegal export of cultural property. In 1984 Patterson was charged by the FBI with attempting to sell a fake Maya fresco to an art dealer and Patterson was sentenced to probation. In 1985 he was convicted of importing the eggs of endangered sea turtles into the United States. In 1995 he was appointed a cultural attaché to the United Nations, before questions about his past caused him to resign and he began to spend more time in Europe, particularly in Germany.

A number of legal cases have followed including the return of items to Mexico and Peru, notably a gold Moche headdress in the form of an octopus recovered with the help of Michel van Rijn.

References

Further reading
Nagin, C. 1984. “Leonardo Patterson arrest”, Stolen Art Alert 5 (5), 3
Honan, W.H. 1995. “Art for whose sake? Trading in antiquities; rare Pre-Columbian relics, at any cost”, New York Times, July 31.
McGroarty P. & A. Olsen 2008. “Antiquities dealer has colorful, checkered career”, Associated Press, October 11.
Conner, S. 2007. “Solved: case of the disappearing headdress, the Mona Lisa of Peru”, Independent, January 9.
Precedo, J. 2008. “Intervenidas en Múnich mil obras únicas precolombinas”, El País, April 30.

External links
Antiquities dealer and alleged smuggler Leonardo Patterson arrested in Spain, facing extradition to Guatemala and Peru.
Over 250 Pieces of the Leonardo Patterson Affair are a Sham.
El Manatí Wooden Olmec Busts.

American art dealers
1942 births
Living people
People from Limón Province